Adnan Abu Odeh (10 November 1933 – 2 February 2022) was a Jordanian politician. He was Minister of Culture from 1970 to 1972 and served in the Senate from 1974 to 1982. 

Abu Odeh died in Amman on 2 February 2022, at the age of 88.

References

1933 births
2022 deaths
Culture ministers of Jordan
Members of the Senate of Jordan
People from Nablus
Members of Hizb ut-Tahrir
Damascus University alumni